
Erich Friderici (21 December 1885 – 19 September 1967) was a German general during World War II. He was the commander of Army Group South Rear Area behind Army Group South from 27 October 1941 to 9 January 1942, while the original commander, Karl von Roques, was on medical leave.

Like other Army Group Rear Areas, the territories under Friderici's control were the sites of mass murder during the Holocaust and other crimes against humanity targeting the civilian population. Rear Area commanders operated in parallel, and in cooperation, with the Higher SS and Police Leaders appointed by the head of the SS, Heinrich Himmler, for each of the army group's rear areas. In the words of historian Michael Parrish, these army commanders "presided over an empire of terror and brutality".

References

Citations

Bibliography

Further reading
 
 

1885 births
1964 deaths
German Army generals of World War II
Generals of Infantry (Wehrmacht)
German Army personnel of World War I
Recipients of the German Cross
Nazi war criminals